Thüringen is a municipality in the district of Bludenz in the Austrian state of Vorarlberg, on the mouth of the Great Walsertal.

Population

Thuringen has 2,151 inhabitants.

Gallery

Personalities 

 Norman Douglas (1868-1952), Scottish writer
 Kaspar Winkler (1872-1951), manufacturer and inventor
 Martin Purtscher (* 1928), former Landeshauptmann of Vorarlberg

References

Cities and towns in Bludenz District